WYJR-LP (95.5 FM) is a radio station licensed to serve the community of Middlesboro, Kentucky. The station is owned by Middlesboro Board of Education, and airs a classic rock format.

The station was assigned the WYJR-LP call letters by the Federal Communications Commission on February 7, 2014.

References

External links
 Official Website
 

YJR-LP
YJR-LP
Radio stations established in 2015
2015 establishments in Kentucky
Classic rock radio stations in the United States
Middlesboro, Kentucky
High school radio stations in the United States
Campus, college, student and university radio stations
Education in Bell County, Kentucky